Otto Keller (23 February 1939 - 6 August 2014) was a German football midfielder.

Career

Statistics

References

External links
 

1939 births
2014 deaths
German footballers
VfL Bochum players
Rot-Weiß Oberhausen players
Association football midfielders